Biometrics is a journal that publishes articles on the application of statistics and mathematics to the biological sciences. It is published by the International Biometric Society (IBS).
Originally published in 1945 under the title Biometrics Bulletin, the journal adopted the shorter title in 1947. A notable contributor to the journal was R.A. Fisher, for whom a memorial edition was published in 1964. In a survey of statistics researchers' opinions, it was ranked fifth overall among 40 statistics journals, and it was second only to the Journal of the American Statistical Association in the ranking provided by biometrics specialists.

References

External links 
 
 Publisher website (Wiley)
 International Biometric Society (IBS)
 Biometry by m2sys.com

Biostatistics journals
Publications established in 1945
Wiley-Blackwell academic journals
English-language journals
Quarterly journals
Academic journals associated with international learned and professional societies